Kogi East Senatorial District is the largest of the three senatorial districts in Kogi State with nine local governments and 51 per cent of total voter population of Kogi State.  The senatorial district covers Idah, Ibaji, Igalamela/Odolu, Ofu, Dekina, Ankpa, Olamaboro, Bassa and Omala local governments. The district is currently represented by Senator Jibrin Isah.

List of members representing the district

Notes

References 

Kogi State
Senatorial districts in Nigeria